This is a list of NATO names for Soviet radars and ELINT systems. For additional reporting names, see NATO reporting names.

NATO reporting names
Ball End – common navigational radar.
Band Stand – Missile tracking and control
Bass Tilt – MR-123, fire control radar of the AK-630 close-in weapon system
Bell Clout – Electronic warfare jamming radar
Bell Shroud – Electronic warfare jamming radar
Bell Squat – Electronic warfare jamming radar
Big Net – Long-range air search radar
Cage Bare – VHF antenna
Cage Cone – VHF antenna
Cage Pot – Electronic warfare jamming radar
Cage Stalk – VHF antenna
Cross Bird – Gius-2 long range air search radar. A copy of British Type 291 radar.
Cross Dome – MR-352 Pozitiv, a target designation radar 
Don – Navigational radar.
Don-Kay – Navigational radar for large ships. Replaced by Palm Frond.
Drum Tilt – MR-104 Rys, a gun fire-control radar
Egg Cup – Fire control radar for guns
Eye Bowl – Missile tracking and control
Fan Song – fire control radar of the SA-2 system
Flat Face – target acquisition radar of the SA-3 system
 Flat Jack - rotodome-mounted airborne search radar of the Tupolev Tu-126 Moss
 Flat Twin 
Fire Dome – fire control radar of the SA-11 system
Flap Lid – fire control radar of the SA-10A/B system
Flash Dance – BRLS-8B "Zaslon" radar found on the MiG-31.
Foxfire – The  TL-25 Smerch-A (also referred to as Product 720) radar featured in the MiG-25
Front Dome – MR-90 Orekh, fire control radar of SA-N-7 system
Grave Stone – fire control radar of the SA-21 system
Grill Pan – fire control radar of the SA-12 system
Hair Net – Long-range air search radar
Half Bow – Fire control radar for guns
Half Plate – MR-755 Fregat, target designation radar of SA-N-7 system
Hawk Screech – MR-105 Turel, a gun fire-control radar
Head Lights – Missile tracking and control
Head Net-A – Long-range air search radar
Head Net-B – Long-range air search radar
Head Net-C – Long-range air search radar
High Pole A – Identification friend or foe antenna
High Pole B – Identification friend or foe antenna
High Sieve – Long-range air search radar
Kite Screech – MR-184, fire control radar of the AK-100 naval gun system
Knife Rest – Long-range air search radar
Land Roll – fire control radar of the SA-8 system
Low Blow – fire control radar of the SA-3 system
Muff Cobb – Fire control radar for guns
Owl Screech – Fire control radar for guns
Palm Frond – MR-212/201, a surface search radar
Pat Hand – fire control radar of the SA-4 system
Peel Group – Missile tracking and control
Plank Shave – Long-range air search radar
Plinth Net – Missile tracking and control
Pop Group – fire-control radar of SA-N-4 system
Pork Trough - mortar-projectile tracking radar
Post Lamp – Fire control radar for guns
Pot Drum – surface search radar
Pot Hand – surface search radar
Punch Bowl – Korvet-5 satellite data link used on Soviet surface ships and submarines.
Round House – Radar array
Rum Tub – Electronic warfare jamming radar
Salt Pot A – Identification friend or foe antenna
Scoop Pair – Missile tracking and control
Scrum Half – fire control radar of the SA-15 system
Side Globe – Electronic warfare jamming radar
Side Net – height finder radar of the SA-3 system
Skip Spin – The Oryol ('eagle') radar set featured perhaps most memorably on the Yak-28, but also on the Su-11, and Su-15.
Slim Net – Long-range air search radar
Slot Back – The N-019 pulse-Doppler target acquisition radar used on the MiG-29
Small Fred - counter-battery/surveillance radar, mounted onto a PRP-3 Val
Small Yarn - mortar-projectile tracking radar mounted in a shelter on an AT-L self-propelled, fully tracked chassis.
Snoop Pair – surface search radar for submarines
Snoop Plate – surface search radar for submarines
Snoop Slab – surface search radar for submarines
Snoop Tray – surface search radar for submarines
Soft Ball – Ramona ELINT system
Spin Scan – The RP-21 Sapfir (sapphire) radar set featured in the MiG-21
Spin Trough – Navigational radar
Square Head – Identification friend or foe antenna
Square Pair – fire control radar of the SA-5 system
Square Tie – surface search radar for small combatants and cruise missile target designation.
Squat Eye – alternate target acquisition radar of the SA-3 system
Steel Yard – The Duga over-the-horizon radar
Straight Flush – fire control radar of the SA-6 system
Strut Curve – MR-302, a surface and air-search radar
Strut Pair – Long-range air search radar
Sun Visor – Fire control radar for guns
Tomb Stone – fire control radar of the SA-20A/B system
Top Bow – Fire control radar for guns
Top Dome – Missile tracking and control
Top Hat A – Electronic warfare jamming radar
Top Hat B – Electronic warfare jamming radar
Top Knot – Radar array
Top Mesh – Long-range air search radar
Top Pair – Long-range air search radar
Top Plate – MR-710 Fregat, a target designation radar
Top Plate-B – MR-760 Fregat, an air search radar
Top Sail – Long-range air search radar
Top Steer – Long-range air search radar
Top Trough – Long-range air search radar
Trap Door – Missile tracking and control
Trash Can – Tamara ELINT system
Vee Bars – HF communication antenna
Vee Cone – HF communication antenna
Vee Tube – HF communication antenna
Watch Dog – Electronic warfare jamming radar

Notes

References

equipment
Military electronics
NATO